The Japanese language has a large inventory of sound symbolic or mimetic words, known in linguistics as ideophones. Such words are found in written as well as spoken Japanese.

Categories
The sound-symbolic words of Japanese can be classified into four main categories:

words that mimic sounds made by living things, like a dog's bark: (wan-wan)

words that mimic sounds made by inanimate objects, like wind blowing or rain falling.

words that depict states, conditions, or manners of the external world (non-auditory senses), such as "damp" or "stealthily".

words that depict psychological states or bodily feelings.

These divisions are not always drawn: sound-symbolism may be referred to generally as onomatopoeia (though strictly this refers to imitative sounds, phonomimes); phonomimes may not be distinguished as animate/inanimate, both being referred to as giseigo; and both phenomimes and psychomimes may be referred to as gitaigo.

In Japanese grammar, sound-symbolic words primarily function as adverbs, though they can also function as verbs (verbal adverbs) with the auxiliary verb , often in the continuous/progressive form , and as adjectives (participle) with the perfective form of this verb . Just like ideophones in many other languages, they are often introduced by a quotative complementizer . Most sound symbolic words can be applied to only a handful of verbs or adjectives. In the examples below, the classified verb or adjective is placed in square brackets.

* Note that unlike the other examples, doki doki is an onomatopoeic word that mimics the sound of two beats of a heart

Other types
In their Dictionary of Basic Japanese Grammar, Seiichi Makino and Michio Tsutsui point out several other types of sound symbolism in Japanese, that relate phonemes and psychological states. This relationship can be correlated with phenomimes containing nasal and velar sounds: While phenomimes containing nasals give the feeling of tactuality and warmth, those containing velars tend to represent hardness, sharpness, and suddenness.

See also
Ideophone
Kuchi shōga (system for "pronouncing" drum sounds)
Sound symbolism
Chinese exclamative particles

Notes

Further reading 
 De Lange, William. (2019). A Dictionary of Japanese Onomatopoeia. TOYO Press.

References 

 Akita, Kimi. 2009. “A Grammar of Sound-Symbolic Words in Japanese: Theoretical Approaches to Iconic and Lexical Properties of Japanese Mimetics”. PhD dissertation, Kobe University. http://www.lib.kobe-u.ac.jp/repository/thesis/d1/D1004724.pdf .
 Akutsu, Satoru (1994). A Practical Guide to Mimetic Expressions Through Pictures. ALC Press, .
 Hamano, Shoko (1998). The sound-symbolic system of Japanese. Tokyo: Kurosio.
 Hasada, Rie (2001). "Meanings of Japanese sound-symbolic emotion words". In Harkins, Jean & Anna Wierzbicka (eds.) Emotions in Crosslinguistic Perspective (Cognitive Linguistics Research 17). Berlin, New York: Mouton de Gruyter, pp. 217–253.
 Kita, Sotaro. 1997. “Two-dimensional Semantic Analysis of Japanese Mimetics.” Linguistics 35: 379–415.
 Nuckolls, Janis B. 2004. “To Be or to Be Not Ideophonically Impoverished.” In SALSA XI: Proceedings of the Eleventh Annual Symposium About Language and Society — Austin, ed. Wai Fong Chiang, Elaine Chun, Laura Mahalingappa, and Siri Mehus, 131–142. Texas Linguistic Forum 47. Austin.
 Seiichi Makino and Michio Tsutsui, Dictionary of Basic Japanese Grammar, The Japan Times, 1986. .
 Martin, Samuel E. (1964). "Speech labels in Japan and Korea", in Dell Hymes (ed.), Language in Culture and Society: A reader in linguistics and anthropology. New York: Harper and Row.
 Ono, Shuuichi (ed.) (1989). A Practical Guide to Japanese-English Onomatopoeia and Mimesis. Tokyo: Hokuseidoo.
 Shibatani, Masayoshi (1990). The Languages of Japan. Cambridge: Cambridge University Press, (esp p. 153vv).
 Voeltz, F. K. Erhard, and Christa Kilian-Hatz, eds. 2001. Ideophones. Typological Studies in Language 44. Amsterdam: John Benjamins.

External links
 Onomatopoeic Expressions - gitaigo and giongo  from Namiko Abe, About.com's guide to Japanese Language
 Nihongoresources - onomatopoeia dictionary
 The Jaded Network - SFX Sound Effects Translations Online Dictionary from TheJadedNetwork.Com
 "'Tokyo Year Zero' Gets Under Readers' Skin" by Alan Cheuse, All Things Considered. A review of a novel that uses Japanese phonomime.
 Japanese Sound effects in Manga and what they mean, originally from www.oop-ack.com (archived copy of the original)

Onomatopoeia
Sound symbolism
Sound symbolism
Phonaesthetics

ja:音象徴#日本語の音象徴